The 2019–20 Delaware Fightin' Blue Hens men's basketball team represents the University of Delaware during the 2019–20 NCAA Division I men's basketball season. The Blue Hens are led by fourth-year head coach Martin Ingelsby and play their home games at the Bob Carpenter Center as members of the Colonial Athletic Association.

Previous season 
The Fightin' Blue Hens finished the 2018–19 season 17–16, 8–10 in CAA play to finish in fifth place. They defeated William & Mary in the quarterfinals of the CAA tournament before losing in the semifinals to Hofstra.

Offseason

Departures

Incoming transfers

Recruiting class of 2019

Recruiting class of 2020

Roster

Schedule 

|-
!colspan=9 style=| Preseason
|-

|-
!colspan=12 style=| Non-conference regular season
|-

|-
!colspan=12 style=| CAA regular season

|-
!colspan=9 style=| CAA tournament
|-

Source:

References 

Delaware Fightin' Blue Hens men's basketball seasons
Delaware Fightin' Blue Hens
Delaware Fightin' Blue Hens
Delaware Fightin' Blue Hens